Volleyball Lover is a 2010 Taiwanese idol romantic-comedy television series. The television drama stars Godfrey Gao as the male main lead and Annie Chen as the female main lead. It began airing on July 16, 2010 on CTS channel after Pandamen.

Synopsis
Growing up together, Bai Qian Rui (Godfrey Gao) and Xin Hai Jing (Annie Chen) never saw one another as more than friends. So it's no wonder when Hai Xing called upon Qian Rui to help out the volleyball team, Qian Rui tried everything to wiggle out of it. He was more interested in romancing the beautiful Jia Kai Lin (Cindy Song) than sweating it out with his best pal. Yet, joining the team was exactly what they needed to turn their long-time friendship into something more.

Cast

Main cast
Godfrey Gao as Bai Qian Rui 白謙睿
Annie Chen as Xin Hai Jing 辛海靜
Lan Jun Tian as Liu Qing Han 陸青瀚
Cindy Song (宋紀妍) as Jia Kai Lin 賈凱琳

Extended cast
Long Long (龍隆) as Jia Tian Hao 賈天昊
Jane Wang as Li Li Yi 李麗宜
Na Wei Xun as Xin Ji 辛吉
Yang Ming Wei as Luo De Hua 羅德華
Zou Zong Han (鄒宗翰) as Shi Tou 石頭
Chen Yan Ru (陳妍汝) as Mei Dai 美黛
He Wan Ting (何宛庭) as Zhen Ping 真平
Xu Shi Hao (許時豪) as Ma Han 馬漢
A Da (阿達) as Wang Chao 王朝
Wang Ming Xun (王明勳) as Xiao Mi 小米
Wang Zi Min (王子珉) as Apple
Jiang Wei Wen (蔣偉文) as Game show host
Zhang Chen Guang as Referee
Qu Zhong Heng as Breakfast owner

Multimedia
Volleyball Lover did not release any soundtrack. However, there are songs used in the series. In particular, the series had ten songs from different artists, released in their respective albums. The opening theme song used is "My Flower" by Freda Li while the ending theme song used is by You Xuan entitled "I Promise You".

Track listing

Ratings
The viewer ratings was conducted by AGB Nielsen.

References

External links
 Volleyball Lover on CTS

Chinese Television System original programming
2010 Taiwanese television series debuts
2010 Taiwanese television series endings
Taiwanese romantic comedy television series